Azovo is a rural locality (a selo) and the administrative center of Azovsky Nemetsky National District of Omsk Oblast, Russia. Population:

Population 
Population of Azovo is mostly German spoken. Half of its population has got German origin.

Geography
The selo is located near the city of Omsk and the Kazakh border.

References

Notes

Sources

Rural localities in Omsk Oblast